

Otto Stapf (13 November 1890 – 30 March 1963) was a German general during World War II  who commanded the 111th Infantry Division. He was the only recipient of both the Knight's Cross of the Iron Cross and the Knight's Cross of the War Merit Cross with Swords of Nazi Germany.

Awards and decorations

 Knight's Cross of the War Merit Cross with Swords 10 September 1944 as General der Infanterie and Chef Wehrmachtwirtschaftstab Ost
 Knight's Cross of the Iron Cross on 31 August 1941 as Generalleutnant and commander of 111. Infanterie-Division

References

Citations

Bibliography

 

1890 births
1963 deaths
German Army generals of World War II
Generals of Infantry (Wehrmacht)
German Army personnel of World War I
Recipients of the clasp to the Iron Cross, 1st class
Recipients of the Knight's Cross of the Iron Cross
People from Kitzingen (district)
Recipients of the Knights Cross of the War Merit Cross
People from the Kingdom of Bavaria
Military personnel from Bavaria
Reichswehr personnel